Barbara Paulus was the defending champion, but did not compete this year.

Manuela Maleeva-Fragnière won the title by defeating Helen Kelesi 6–3, 3–6, 6–3 in the final.

Seeds
The first four seeds received a bye into the second round.

Draw

Finals

Top half

Bottom half

References

External links
 Official results archive (ITF)
 Official results archive (WTA)

WTA Swiss Open
European Open - Singles